Baladiyah Al-Shemal, officially the Al-Shamal Sub-Municipality,  is a baladiyah and one of the 16 sub-municipalities of Riyadh, Saudi Arabia, next to King Khalid International Airport. Spanned across 448 square kilometers, it includes 17 districts and neighborhoods, including Banban, al-Khair, Hittin and the premises of Imam Mohammad Ibn Saud Islamic University.

See also

Al Nafal, Riyadh

References 

Shamal